Nelson's spiny pocket mouse (Heteromys nelsoni) is a species of rodent in the family Heteromyidae. It is found in Mexico and Guatemala. Its natural habitat is subtropical or tropical moist lowland forests. It is threatened by habitat loss.

Sources

Nelson's Spiny Pocket Mouse
Rodents of Central America
Mammals of Mexico
Mammals described in 1902
Taxonomy articles created by Polbot